SHARE in Africa is a 501(c)(3) nonprofit organization that supports girls' education in Africa.  It was founded in 2008 by Shannon McNamara with the mission to address the 'book famine' in Africa by providing girls with learning materials.

Since its inception, SHARE has given educational opportunities to thousands of girls in Tanzania.  Specifically, 40,000 students and teachers in 9 schools in Africa have been supplied with tons of learning materials including 33,000 books, laptop computers, and E-readers.  SHARE has built libraries, a community center, computer rooms, and has installed electricity and solar power into the Tanzanian schools.

SHARE is now focusing its efforts on sponsoring girls to attend secondary school.

Shannon McNamara spoke about SHARE's work educating girls at the White House in 2011 as part of the 100th anniversary celebration of International Women's Day. She also wrote a blog for the White House 

SHARE is headquartered in St. Petersburg, Florida in the United States.

References

External links
 https://www.wsj.com/articles/SB10001424053111903461104576460273674572138
SHARE's Official Website
SHARE Founder awarded Gloria Barron Prize for Young Heroes
SHARE Founder Blogs for White House
SHARE Founder featured One-on-One with Steve Adubato News Program - video
SHARE Founder featured on The Nate Berkus - video
SHARE in Africa featured on News 12 New Jersey - video
SHARE Founder featured in Baker Institute Article 
“Nonprofit Spotlight: Shannon McNamara, SHARE: Shannon’s After-school Reading Exchange”

Charities based in New Jersey
Companies based in Somerset County, New Jersey
Educational charities based in the United States
Education in Tanzania
Organizations established in 2008
2008 establishments in New Jersey